Alberto Sansimena Chamorro (born 26 May 1985), known as Tete, is a Spanish retired footballer who played as a winger.

Club career
Born in Badajoz, Extremadura, Tete made his senior debut with CP Cacereño in the 2003–04 season in the Segunda División B, suffering team relegation. He only returned to the third division in the 2006–07 campaign, signing with CF Villanovense.

Tete alternated between the third tier and Tercera División in the following years, playing for Xerez CD B, CD Manchego, CD Badajoz and Albacete Balompié. On 15 July 2013, he joined Segunda División club Real Murcia.

On 18 August 2013, aged 28, Tete played his first professional match, starting in a 2–3 home loss against Recreativo de Huelva. He scored his first goal in the competition on 8 December, the first in a 1–1 away draw with CD Mirandés.

On 26 August 2014, after the Murcians' relegation, Tete signed with fellow league team SD Ponferradina in a season-long loan deal. He moved abroad on 1 July of the following year, joining AEK Larnaca FC of the Cypriot First Division.

Club statistics

Honours
AEK Larnaca
Cypriot Cup: 2017–18

References

External links
 
 
 

1985 births
Living people
Sportspeople from Badajoz
Spanish footballers
Footballers from Extremadura
Association football wingers
Segunda División players
Segunda División B players
Tercera División players
CP Cacereño players
AD Cerro de Reyes players
CF Villanovense players
Xerez CD B players
CD Badajoz players
Albacete Balompié players
Real Murcia players
SD Ponferradina players
CD Don Benito players
Cypriot First Division players
AEK Larnaca FC players
Spanish expatriate footballers
Expatriate footballers in Cyprus
Spanish expatriate sportspeople in Cyprus